Vardaman Kimball Smith was a college football player.

Ole Miss
He was a prominent guard for the Ole Miss Rebels football team of the University of Mississippi. He was also captain of the track team.

1927
Smith starred in the first Egg Bowl with a trophy. He "broke through repeatedly and held his post in violate to Aggie thrusts;" opening holes for Sollie Cohen. Smith was selected All-Southern. He was given honorable mention on the All-America team.

References

Ole Miss Rebels football players
American football guards
All-Southern college football players